Edgerton is a city in northeastern Platte County, Missouri and is part of the Kansas City metropolitan area within the United States. The population was 546 at the 2010 census.

History
A post office called Edgerton has been in operation since 1871. The community was named after one Mr. Edgerton, a railroad employee.

Geography
Edgerton is located along Missouri routes B and Z. The community is 1.5 miles east of the Platte River on Grove Creek. The Smithville Reservoir is about six miles east in adjacent Clinton County.

Demographics

2010 census
As of the census of 2010, there were 546 people, 210 households, and 161 families living in the city. The racial makeup of the city was 97.6% White, 0.2% African American, 0.4% Native American, 0.9% Asian, and 0.9% from two or more races. Hispanic or Latino of any race were 0.9% of the population.

There were 210 households, of which 35.7% had children under the age of 18 living with them, 61.9% were married couples living together, 10.0% had a female householder with no husband present, 4.8% had a male householder with no wife present, and 23.3% were non-families. 20.0% of all households were made up of individuals, and 6.7% had someone living alone who was 65 years of age or older. The average household size was 2.60 and the average family size was 2.97.

The median age in the city was 40.2 years. 24.5% of residents were under the age of 18; 7% were between the ages of 18 and 24; 26% were from 25 to 44; 31.4% were from 45 to 64; and 11% were 65 years of age or older. The gender makeup of the city was 49.1% male and 50.9% female.

2000 census
As of the census of 2000, there were 533 people, 202 households, and 159 families living in the city. The population density was 1,422.4 people per square mile (556.2/km2). There were 214 housing units at an average density of 571.1 per square mile (223.3/km2). The racial makeup of the city was 97.94% White, 0.38% Native American, and 1.69% from two or more races.

There were 202 households, out of which 38.1% had children under the age of 18 living with them, 69.8% were married couples living together, 7.4% had a female householder with no husband present, and 20.8% were non-families. 18.3% of all households were made up of individuals, and 7.9% had someone living alone who was 65 years of age or older. The average household size was 2.64 and the average family size was 3.01.

In the city the population was spread out, with 27.2% under the age of 18, 7.5% from 18 to 24, 30.6% from 25 to 44, 23.5% from 45 to 64, and 11.3% who were 65 years of age or older. The median age was 38 years. For every 100 females, there were 111.5 males. For every 100 females age 18 and over, there were 102.1 males.

The median income for a household in the city was $42,411, and the median income for a family was $50,625. Males had a median income of $35,167 versus $23,125 for females. The per capita income for the city was $18,444. About 7.5% of families and 9.8% of the population were below the poverty line, including 13.6% of those under age 18 and 16.1% of those age 65 or over.

Education
North Platte County R-I School District operates one school in the community: North Platte Intermediate School.

Edgerton has a public library, a branch of the Mid-Continent Public Library.

Notable person

Jim Davis, actor and native of Edgerton

References

Cities in Platte County, Missouri
Cities in Missouri